The following highways are numbered 273:

Canada
Manitoba Provincial Road 273
 Quebec Route 273

Japan
 Japan National Route 273

United States
 Alabama State Route 273
 Arizona State Route 273
 California State Route 273
 Delaware Route 273
 Florida State Road 273
 Georgia State Route 273
 Iowa Highway 273 (former)
 K-273 (Kansas highway)
 Kentucky Route 273
 Maryland Route 273
 Minnesota State Highway 273
 Missouri Route 273
 Montana Secondary Highway 273
 New Mexico State Road 273
 New York State Route 273 (former)
 Ohio State Route 273
 Oregon Route 273
 South Dakota Highway 273
 Tennessee State Route 273
 Texas State Highway 273
 Texas State Highway Spur 273
 Farm to Market Road 273 (Texas)
 Utah State Route 273
 Virginia State Route 273
 Wyoming Highway 273